Complexe Maisonneuve is an office building complex in Montreal, Quebec, Canada. Complexe Maisonneuve is located on De la Gauchetière Street West between University Street and Beaver Hall Hill. It is situated facing Victoria Square in the Quartier international district of Downtown Montreal, and is linked to Montreal's Underground City and Square-Victoria-OACI Station on the Montreal Metro. The complex consists of two buildings, the Tour de la Banque Nationale and 700 de La Gauchetière. It was inaugurated on October 31, 1983. The two towers share an underground base six floors deep.

The complex was designed by American architect Sylvia Gottwald-Thapar in the modernist architectural style, and is the only all-steel structure built in Montreal since the 1960s.

600 de La Gauchetière West
It is located at 600 De la Gauchetière Street West.

The building is home to the headquarters of the National Bank of Canada and Raymond Chabot Grant Thornton.

700 de La Gauchetière West

It is located at 700 De la Gauchetière Street West.

The tower is currently home to offices of actuarial company, Aon Corporation and the headquarters of the Réseau de transport métropolitain.  It was previously home to the headquarters of Bell Canada Enterprises.

See also
 List of tallest buildings in Montreal

References

External links
 700 de La Gauchetière

Skyscrapers in Montreal
Office buildings completed in 1983
Modernist architecture in Canada
Downtown Montreal
Bank headquarters in Canada
Twin towers
Skyscraper office buildings in Canada
National Bank of Canada